MSOP may refer to:

 Mandolin Society of Peterborough, non-profit community mandolin orchestra base in Peterborough, Ontario, Canada
 Memphis School of Preaching, American two-year collegiate institution
 Mini Small Outline Package, surface mount package for electronics